The "Giuseppe Dal Ben" Ski Jumping Arena (in Italian: Stadio del salto "Giuseppe Dal Ben") is a ski jumping venue in Predazzo, Val di Fiemme, Trentino, in northern Italy. It is a venue in the FIS Ski jumping World Cup.

Opened in 1989, the venue hosted the ski jumping and nordic combined events of three editions of FIS Nordic World Ski Championships (1991, 2003, 2013), of 2013 Winter Universiade, as well as many events of the Ski jumping World Cup. It will host ski jumping and nordic combined for the 2026 Winter Olympics in Milan and Cortina d'Ampezzo.

History 
In the mid-1930s, a ski jump was built on the Rolle Pass at an altitude of 1984 m above sea level, in the ski area between Predazzo and San Martino di Castrozza. At the time, the ski jump was managed by the local ski clubs of Val di Fiemme (G.S. Fiamme Gialle di Predazzo and U.S. Dolomitica). The Fiamme Gialle ski jump at Rolle Pass was modernised in 1973 and until the end of the 1980s it was approved by the International Ski Federation FIS as a K65 ski jump. Between 1979 and 1987 it also hosted competitions of the Alpen Cup and European Cup. After the construction of the new ski jump K65 in Stalimen in 1984, followed by the other jumps in 1989, the Rolle Pass ski jump was abandoned.

After the FIS Nordic World Ski Championships 1991 were awarded by the international committee meeting in Istanbul in 1988, the Predazzo jumping stadium was inaugurated in 1989. The cost of the construction of the sports facility, considered avant-garde at the time, was 14.5 billion lire, entirely financed by the Autonomous Province of Trento.

The Predazzo Arena hosted the ski jumping and Nordic combined competitions of the 1991 Nordic World Ski Championships, where Franci Petek was the last athlete to win a medal for Yugoslavia shortly before his country fell to the tragedy of war; in the same competition, Jens Weißflog was the first German athlete to win an individual medal for Germany after the reunification of East and West Germany.

The 2003 Nordic World Ski Championships were subsequently held there and again in 2013, as well as numerous stages of the Nordic Combined World Cup and Ski Jumping World Cup. In 2013 it hosted the competitions of the 2013 Winter Universiade

In 2016, a K10 ski jump was added and the K20 and K30 ski jumps were renovated, all with new plastic covers. After 12 years of neglect, the K60 (HS66), one of the most important trampolines for developing young jumpers towards the K95, was also rebuilt in 2019.

Venue 
The  area consists of two main ski jumping hills (HS 134 and HS 106), other training hills (K35 and K62) and facilities for athletes, judges, federations, journalists, media, and spectators. The hills are covered with ceramic material and landing areas are covered with plastic material, guaranteeing the functionality throughout the year also in summer. The lighting system also allows competitions events by night.

The main building hosts also the Organising Committee of the cross-country ski event "Marcialonga", that every January passes through the arena.

The nearby gondola lift complex runs to the slopes of Ski Center Latemar in winter, and in summer to the alpine trails on the mountain Latemar, part of the UNESCO world heritage site of Dolomites.

Details 
The two main trampolines are a HS 136 with point K 120 (long trampoline) and a HS 106 (since 2017 reverted to HS104) with point K 95 (normal trampoline); both official distance records (136 and 107.5 m) belong to polish Adam Małysz, who set them in 2003 (in 2019 Ryōyū Kobayashi equalled the World Cup record of 136 metres). The unofficial record from the long jump, however, was set by german Eric Frenzel at the Nordic World Ski Championships in 2013 (138.5 m), while in 2016 Samuel Costa recorded a jump of 142 m in the Nordic combined.

There are also four school jumps, which can be used both in winter and summer:
 K60: HS 66
 Stalimen school: HS 35 (point K 33)
 Fiamme Gialle: HS 20 (point K 19)
 Baby: HS 16 (point K 15)

Long trampoline 
 Chute length: 115.36 m
 Maximum chute slope: 30°
 Minimum slide slope: 10.5°
 Chute width: 3 m
 Threshold length: 7 m
 Landing slope: 34.9°
 Point K: 120 m
 Hill size (HS): 136 m

Normal trampoline 
 Chute length: 92.58 m
 Maximum chute slope: 30°
 Minimum chute slope: 10.5°
 Threshold length: 6.5 m
 Threshold height: 2.38 m
 Landing slope: 34.99°
 K point: 95 m
 Hill size (HS): 104 m (106 m until 2017)

Main events hosted 

 Winter Olympics: 2026
 Nordic World Ski Championships: 1991, 2003, 2013
 Winter Universiade: 2013
 Ski Jumping World Cup: 1990, 1992, 1993, 1994, 1996, 1998, 1999, 2000, 2002, 2008, 2012, 2019, 2020
 Nordic Combined World Cup: 1995, 1996, 1997, 1999, 2000, 2001, 2002, 2004, 2006, 2007, 2008, 2009, 2010, 2012, 2014, 2015, 2016, 2017, 2018, 2019, 2020
 Italian Nordic Ski Championships: 2008

Records

Large hill

Normal hill

References

See also 

 Lago di Tesero Cross Country Stadium
 Predazzo
 Latemar

1988 establishments in Italy
Buildings and structures in Trentino
Ski jumping venues in Italy
Sports venues completed in 1988
Venues of the 2026 Winter Olympics